Guanitoxin (GNT), formerly known as anatoxin-a(S) "Salivary", is a naturally occurring cyanotoxin commonly isolated from cyanobacteria (specifically of the genus Anabaena) and causes excess salivation in mammals via inhibition of acetylcholinesterase. Guanitoxin was first structurally characterized in 1989, and consists of a cyclic N-hydroxyguanine organophosphate with a phosphate ester moiety.

Toxicity and treatment
The clinical signs of high level guanitoxin exposure consists mainly of excessive salivation, lacrimation, chromodacryorrhea (in rats), urinary incontinence, muscular weakness, muscle twitching, convulsion, including opisthotonus, and respiratory distress and/or failure.

Treatment of afflicted case by atropine has attested to suppress the muscarinic mediated toxicity; which prevents the namesake salivation that similarly reacts to prevent the toxin's other poisoning symptoms which include lacrimation, urinary incontinence and defecation. Atropine will not, however, counter another mechanism of the compounds toxicity as it also mediates a nicotinic adverse toxicity affecting muscle tremors, fasciculation, convulsions and respiratory failure.

Stability and degradation
Guanitoxin is generally labile. It decomposes rapidly in basic solutions, but is relatively stable in neutral or acidic solutions (pH 3-5). When stored at -20˚C, it slowly undergoes hydrolysis giving (5S)-5-[(dimethylamino)methyl]-2-imino-1-imidazolidinol and monomethyl-phosphate, and more slowly, formation of (S)-1-(2-iminoimidazolidin-4-yl)-N,N-dimethylmethanamine. Furthemore, air evaporation of guanitoxin resulted in significant hydrolysis to (5S)-5-[(dimethylamino)methyl]-2-imino-1-imidazolidinol.

See also
Anatoxin-a – a cyanotoxin that shares some clinical exposure signs, and also relates to the same cyanobacteria genera, but with a different chemical structure and toxic mechanism of action
Paraoxon – A synthetic pesticide with an analogous mechanism of action

References

Acetylcholinesterase inhibitors
Neurotoxins
Guanidine alkaloids
Organophosphates
Methyl esters
Cyanotoxins
Nitrogen heterocycles
Dimethylamino compounds
Bacterial alkaloids